is a Japanese film directed by Tai Kato in 1963.  It is a jidaigeki musical about Sasuke Sarutobi and the Sanada Ten Braves who, under the leadership of Yukimura Sanada, try to defend Toyotomi Hideyori during the siege of Osaka Castle by the Tokugawa armies. Yoshiyuki Fukuda helped adapt his own stage play for the screen.

Cast
 Kinnosuke Yorozuya as Sasuke
 Misako Watanabe
 Minoru Chiaki: Sanada Yukimura

References

External links

 Sanada fūunroku  at the Japanese Cinema Database
 Sanada fūunroku  in the database of the National Film Center

1963 films
Films directed by Tai Kato
Jidaigeki films
Japanese musical films
Toei Company films
Samurai films
1963 musical films
Cultural depictions of Sanada clan
1960s Japanese films
1960s Japanese-language films